Daniel Lynch (born June 21, 1962) is a former college and professional American football offensive guard; he attended Washington State University; he was inducted to their athletic Hall of Fame in 2006. Lynch went on to a career in the venture capital industry in Central and Eastern Europe.

Football career
Lynch attended Lewis and Clark High School in Spokane, Washington. From 1980 to 1984, he played college football for the Washington State Cougars, where he started for four years. After completing his senior season with the 1983 Cougars and was named 1st Team All-Pac 10, 2nd Team All-American (Sporting News) and played in the January 1984 Senior Bowl all-star game, and was subsequently granted an extra year of eligibility and played for the 1984 Cougars.

In 1984, Lynch was a team captain and 1984 First Team All-American, and unanimously won the Morris Trophy as the Pac-10's top offensive lineman.  He was also on the 1984 Bob Hope Christmas Special with the AP All-American team. Lynch played in the East–West Shrine Game, and became the first (and to date only) player to appear in a second Senior Bowl. Lynch was also a three-time Academic All-American in the Pac-10 (1982, 1983, 1984).

Lynch is known for a memorable remark before the 1984 Apple Cup against the rival Washington Huskies, "There are four important stages in your life. You're born, you play the Huskies, you get married and you die."

Lynch was drafted by the Denver Broncos of the National Football League (NFL) in the 1985 NFL Draft. While he was with the Broncos in pre-season, he didn't play in a regular season NFL game. Due to his illness, Lynch retired from football.

Personal life
After retiring from football, Lynch completed an MBA at the Haas School of Business at the University of California at Berkeley. He moved to work in the venture capital industry in Central Europe, residing first in Budapest, Hungary and then in Prague, Czech Republic. In addition to English, he speaks Hungarian and Czech.

References

Living people
1962 births
Washington State Cougars football players
American football offensive linemen
Players of American football from Minnesota
People from Rochester, Minnesota
Washington State University alumni
Haas School of Business alumni
American venture capitalists